USS  Catherine Johnson (SP-379), later USS Freight Lighter No. 161, later USS YF-161, later USS YC-660, was a freight lighter in commission in the United States Navy from 1918 to 1930.
 
Catherine Johnson was built as the commercial steam freight lighter Edith B. in 1913.  She had been renamed Catherine Johnson by the time the U.S. Navy inspected her in 1917 for possible naval use during World War I and assigned her the section patrol number SP-390. The Navy eventually purchased her and placed her in service as USS Catherine Johnson (SP-390) on 15 June 1918.

Catherine Johnson was assigned to the 3rd Naval District, where she transported supplies for the next 12 years, probably in the New York City area. Her name was changed to Freight Lighter No. 161 sometime before mid-1920. When the U.S. Navy adopted its modern hull number system on 17 July 1920, she received the "freight lighter" classification "YF" and was renamed USS YF-161.

On 19 November 1930, YF-161 was placed out of service. At about the same time, she was reclassified as an "open lighter, non-self-propelled" (YC) and renamed USS YC-660.

YC-660 was sold on 29 September 1932.

References

NavSource Online: Section Patrol Craft Photo Archive: YC-660 ex-YF-161 ex-Freight Lighter No. 161 ex-Catherine Johnson (SP 390)

Auxiliary ships of the United States Navy
World War I auxiliary ships of the United States
1913 ships